Nicholas Hlobo is a South African artist based in Johannesburg, South Africa. He was born in 1975 in Cape Town. He earned a Bachelor of Technology from Technikon Witwatersrand in 2002. He creates large sculptural works that are expansive masses which at once feel oozey, voluptuous and highly structured. Through his work, he navigates his identity as a gay Xhosa man in South Africa and reevaluates the definition of masculinity and sexuality in his country. The  contrast of femininity and masculinity is created by his use of dissimilar materials such as rubber inner tubes, ribbon, organza, lace and found objects.

Awards 
Hlobo is the winner of the 2006 Tollman Award for Visual Art, the 2009 Standard Bank Young Artist Award, he was a finalist for the Future Generation Art Prize 2010. In 2010, Hlobo was selected as a protégé by mentor Sir Anish Kapoor as part of the Rolex Mentor and Protégé Arts Initiative, an international philanthropic programme that pairs masters in their disciplines with emerging talents for a year of one-to-one creative exchange. Nicholas Hlobo received his first VILLA Extraordinary Award for Sculpture in 2016.

Exhibitions

Hlobo's work has been exhibited in the Tate Modern in London, the South African National Gallery, and the Institute of Contemporary Art, Boston, among several other venues. His work has also been included in the Havana Biennial of 2009 and the Guangzhou Triennial of 2008. Hlobo was the first black festival artist of the Aardklop arts festival in Potchefstroom in 2008.
A major survey exhibition of Hlobo's work was on at the National Museum of Art, Architecture and Design in Oslo, Norway, from 4 March to 29 May 2011. Hlobo and David Goldblatt were the only two South African artists invited by curator Bice Curiger to exhibit work on the international pavilion IllUMinations of the 2011 Venice Biennale.
He is included on La Triennale 2012 in Paris and on The Rainbow Nation, an exhibition of three generations of sculpture from South Africa, at The Hague. He has also been selected for the 18th Biennale of Sydney.  In 2013 and 2014 his work will feature in exhibitions in Miami (Intethe), Aalborg (Out of Fashion : Textiles in International Contemporary Art), San Francisco (Public Intimacy : Art and other extraordinary Acts in South Africa) and The Divine Comedy. Heaven, Purgatory and Hell Revisited by Contemporary African Artists -Museum für Moderne Kunst (MMK), Frankfurt/Main.

References

External links
 The Rolex Mentor and Protege Arts Initiative
 Nicholas Hlobo, Michael Stevenson Gallery
 Meet Nicholas Hlobo, Standard Bank Young Artist Award
 The Rolex Mentor and Protege Arts Initiative
 Nicholas Hlobo, South Africa Info
 Uhambo, Tate Modern
 Articles about Nicholas Hlobo, Mail & Guardian
 Nicholas Hlobo by Sue Williamson , Artthrob

Artists from Cape Town
1975 births
South African contemporary artists
Living people